Klaudia Michnová (born 4 June 1990) is a Slovak handball player for HK Slávia Partizánske and the Slovak national team.

References

1990 births
Living people
Slovak female handball players